David Thomas (born 27 June 1927) was a British field hockey player. He competed in the men's tournament at the 1956 Summer Olympics.

References

External links
 

1927 births
Living people
British male field hockey players
Olympic field hockey players of Great Britain
Field hockey players at the 1956 Summer Olympics
Sportspeople from Pontypridd